Kim Tae-woo (born 30 March 1994) is a South Korean footballer who plays as a midfielder.

Career

Professional
Tae-woo signed with United Soccer League side Colorado Springs Switchbacks on 22 March 2016.

References

1994 births
Living people
South Korean footballers
South Korean expatriate footballers
Colorado Springs Switchbacks FC players
Association football midfielders
Expatriate soccer players in the United States
USL Championship players